High School of Music and Art may refer to:

 Fiorello H. LaGuardia High School, formed in 1984 as the merger of other schools
 The High School of Music and Art, New York alternative school established in 1936, which merged in 1984 into the Fiorello school
 High School of Performing Arts, New York school founded in 1948. Inspiration for the 1980 film Fame, it merged in 1984 into the Fiorello school
 Juilliard School, prestigious performing arts conservatory in New York, established in 1905